Life in the Streets is the debut album by reggae/ragga recording artist Prince Ital Joe and the third album by rapper Marky Mark. The album was released in 1994 for Ultraphonic Records and blended Prince Ital Joe's reggae with Marky Mark's hip hop. Life in the Streets was not released in the United States, but it was a success in Germany, where most of the album was produced in the Eurodance style. Four singles charted on Germany's Media Control Charts: "Life in the Streets" (#12), "Happy People" (#4), "Babylon" (#17), and "United", which held the #1 position for five weeks.  Songs "Life in the Streets", "In Love" and "United" appeared in the Danny DeVito movie Renaissance Man, while "United" also appeared in The NeverEnding Story III.

Critical reception
Music & Media wrote, "United they made more impact then the two on their own. The album roughly follows the pattern of the hit single(s), which is Euro dance coupled with American rap know-how. Currently residing on Jamaica, the Prince throws in some reggae (To Be Important) for good measure, whereas Boston kid Marky takes care of the streetwise hip hop (In The 90's). Despite his job as a model for Calvin Klein, he's still very keen on staying real. It's the kind of reality, based on the certainty of a further string of hits engendered by this work of collaboration."

Track listing
"Life in the Streets Intro" - 1:43 
"United"- 4:02 
"Rastaman Vibration"- 3:35 
"Happy People"- 3:58 
"To Be Important"- 3:54 
"In Love"- 3:40 
"Babylon"- 3:54 
"Love of a Mother"- 3:38 
"Into the Light"- 3:56 
"In the 90's"- 3:16 
"Prankster"- 5:02 
"Life in the Streets"- 3:44

Credits 
Lyrics: Alex Christensen (tracks: 1, 2, 4, 6, 7, 9, 12), Frank Peterson (tracks: 1, 2, 4, 7, 9, 12), Joe Paquette, Mark Wahlberg
Music: Alex Christensen (tracks: 1 to 5, 10, 12), Frank Peterson (tracks: 1 to 5, 7, 9, 10, 12)
Performer [All Instruments]: Frank Peterson (tracks: 1-7, 9, 10, 12)
Guitar: Thomas Schwarz
Producer: Alex Christensen (tracks: 1-7, 9, 10, 12), Frank Peterson (tracks: 1-7, 9, 10, 12), Fabian Cooke, Joe Paquette, Tyrone Downing (track 8), Fabian Cooke, MC Shan (track 11)
Solo Vocals: Melina Bruhn, Bridget Fogle, Linda Fields 
Backing Vocals: Betsy Miller, Jane Commerford, Kelvyn Hallifax, The London Gospel Community Choir, Penny Lane, Reggie Montgomery, Sandra Blake, Sophie St Claire
Photography: Paul Cox

References

Prince Ital Joe albums
Mark Wahlberg albums
1994 debut albums